Emiel is a Dutch cognate of the masculine given name Emil. People with the name include:

Emiel Boersma ((born 1980), Dutch beach volleyball player
Emiel Christensen (1895–1988), American architect from Nebraska
 (1909–1995), Belgian Bishop of Bruges
Emiel Faignaert (1919–1980), Belgian cyclist
Emiel van Lennep (1915–1996), Dutch diplomat and Minister of State
Emiel Mellaard (born 1966), Dutch long jumper
Emiel Pauwels (1918–2014), Belgian track and field athlete
Emiel Pijnaker, Dutch film producer, composer and singer
Emiel Puttemans (born 1947), Belgian middle- and long-distance runner
Emiel Rogiers (1923–1998), Belgian racing cyclist
Emiel Van Cauter (1931–1975), Belgian racing cyclist
Emiel van Heurck (1871–1931), Belgian folklorist
Emiel Wastyn (born 1992), Belgian racing cyclist

Dutch masculine given names